Silver Sonntak (born 11 November 1976) is an Estonian rower.
He was born in Pärnu.

He started his rowing training in 1991, coached by Mihkel Leppik and Tatjana Jaanson. He graduated from Tallinn University of Applied Sciences in 2000, with a degree in automotive technology.

He has won Estonian championships in 29 times. In 2004 he was a reserve competitor for Estonian rower team in 2004 Summer Olympics in Athena.

In 2002 he was chosen as Estonian Rowing Association's best male rower.

References

Living people
1976 births
Estonian male rowers
Sportspeople from Pärnu